Zlatograd Rock (Zlatogradski Kamak \zla-to-'grad-ski 'ka-m&k\) is a rocky 240 m peak forming the eastern extremity of Bowles Ridge, Livingston Island in the South Shetland Islands, Antarctica.  The peak overlooks Struma Glacier to the northwest and Huron Glacier to the southeast.  It is named after the town of Zlatograd in the Rhodope Mountains, Southern Bulgaria.

Location

First mapped from the Bulgarian topographic survey Tangra 2004/05.

Maps
 L.L. Ivanov et al. Antarctica: Livingston Island and Greenwich Island, South Shetland Islands. Scale 1:100000 topographic map. Sofia: Antarctic Place-names Commission of Bulgaria, 2005.
 L.L. Ivanov. Antarctica: Livingston Island and Greenwich, Robert, Snow and Smith Islands. Scale 1:120000 topographic map. Troyan: Manfred Wörner Foundation, 2010.  (First edition 2009. )
 Antarctic Digital Database (ADD). Scale 1:250000 topographic map of Antarctica. Scientific Committee on Antarctic Research (SCAR). Since 1993, regularly updated.
 L.L. Ivanov. Antarctica: Livingston Island and Smith Island. Scale 1:100000 topographic map. Manfred Wörner Foundation, 2017.

References
 Zlatograd Rock. SCAR Composite Antarctic Gazetteer
 Bulgarian Antarctic Gazetteer. Antarctic Place-names Commission. (details in Bulgarian, basic data in English)

Mountains of Livingston Island